Hat Island is an uninhabited island located in the Qikiqtaaluk Region of Nunavut, Canada. It is a member of the Sverdrup Islands group and the Arctic Archipelago. It is also a member of the Queen Elizabeth Islands and the Arctic Archipelago.

Another larger (about 4 × 8 km) Hat Island is also in Nunavut.

References

External links
 Hat Island in the Atlas of Canada - Toporama; Natural Resources Canada

Islands of the Queen Elizabeth Islands
Sverdrup Islands
Uninhabited islands of Qikiqtaaluk Region